James William Hennigan Jr. (March 17, 1927 – January 3, 2020) was an American politician who served in the Massachusetts House of Representatives from 1953 to 1955 and in the Massachusetts Senate from 1955 to 1965.

Hennigan graduated from Babson Institute Suffolk University Law School. He served as a member of the Massachusetts House of Representatives from 1953 to 1955, the Massachusetts Senate from 1955 to 1965 and a member of the Boston School Committee from 1970 to 1974.

Hennigan ran for mayor of Boston in 1959, but lost that election. He was also the Democratic nominee for Massachusetts Attorney General in 1964, but lost to Edward Brooke. His father James W. Hennigan Sr. also served in the Massachusetts General Court. He was a driving force behind his daughter Maura Hennigan's unsuccessful 2005 attempt to become mayor of Boston.

Hennigan is the Hennigan referred to in Morgan v. Hennigan since he was head of the Boston School Committee at the time. However, Hennigan had been the leading advocate of trying to implement integration on the School Committee.

His daughter Maura Hennigan was a member of the Boston City Council from 1982 through 2005, and a candidate for Mayor of Boston in November 2005.

Hennigan died on January 3, 2020, in Boston, Massachusetts at age 92.

See also
 1953–1954 Massachusetts legislature
 1955–1956 Massachusetts legislature

References

Sources
summary with oral history interview
Boston Globe July 12, 2010

External links

1927 births
2020 deaths
Babson College alumni
Boston School Committee members
Democratic Party Massachusetts state senators
Democratic Party members of the Massachusetts House of Representatives
Politicians from Boston
Suffolk University Law School alumni
Lawyers from Boston